Melissa Fumero (née Gallo; born August 19, 1982) is an American actress. She made her professional debut in 2004, in the recurring role of Adriana Cramer in the television soap opera One Life to Live. Following several minor roles, Fumero had her first main role  as Amy Santiago in the Fox—later NBC—comedy series Brooklyn Nine-Nine, a role she played from 2013 to 2021. Since then, Fumero has voiced Melissa Tarleton in the animated series M.O.D.O.K. (2021) and starred as Eliza Walker in Netflix's comedy Blockbuster (2022). She is married to actor and former model David Fumero, with whom she has two sons.

Early life
Melissa Gallo was born in Lyndhurst, New Jersey, on August 19, 1982. Her Cuban parents moved to the U.S. as teenagers. Her mother was a homemaker and hairdresser, while her father taught mathematics and worked at a jewelry store. Gallo grew up in Guttenberg and moved back to Lyndhurst at age six. She and her family spoke Spanish at home but her parents stopped forcing her and her brother to do so after he encountered issues at school.

As a child, Gallo enjoyed creating and performing plays, and began taking dance lessons. She expressed interest in acting after seeing Broadway's The Secret Garden at the age of ten. Her parents subsequently sent her to acting classes. She enjoyed theater lessons because she and her classmates were focused on performing rather than their physical appearances. She remained enrolled in dance and acting classes until her graduation. When she received the acceptance letter for New York University (NYU), which she called her "dream school", she believed she would be unable to attend due to the cost. To ensure she could attend, her parents spent much of their savings, took out many loans, and had Gallo live at their home until she moved to New York City at age 19. In 2003, she graduated with a Bachelor of Fine Arts degree in drama.

Career

2004–2012: One Life to Live and other roles
Gallo felt ostracized when she began working in the entertainment business. She was only able to audition for certain roles. Hours after her final exam at NYU, she was offered the role of Adriana Cramer on soap opera One Life to Live (OLTL), which she described as "the biggest redeeming moment". Gallo joined the series on January 20, 2004. She reprised her role in two 2005 episodes of All My Children. Fumero was set to leave the show shortly after her contract with OLTL expired in January 2008, but stayed until June 11; her final scenes were filmed in May. Fumero returned to One Life to Live on several occasions between September 2008 and January 2011.

In 2008, she starred in Tiny Dancer as Ati, a seventeen-year-old who is persuaded to dance. For the role, Fumero learned the character's Spanish Harlem accent—a task she found difficult—and extensively trained in stretching and yoga to perform the modern and contemporary dance. After One Life to Live, Fumero expressed interest in performing comedy and booked a role in Important Things with Demetri Martin for Comedy Central in 2009. The following years, she appeared in Gossip Girl, Royal Pains, The Mentalist, and CSI: NY.

2013–2020: breakthrough with Brooklyn Nine-Nine
Fumero's first starring role and breakthrough came in 2013, when she was cast in Fox's untitled comedy pilot as the female lead opposite Andy Samberg. The show's title was announced in April 2013 as Brooklyn Nine-Nine. It follows a group of New York Police Department detectives in Brooklyn's fictional 99th precinct. Fumero portrays the rule-following, competitive character Amy Santiago. To prepare, she and Brooklyn cast received police and firearm training. Fumero is one of the show's two regular Latina cast members, the other being Stephanie Beatriz, who portrays Rosa Diaz. Fumero described this casting as groundbreaking, though the two feared one of them would be fired. As a result, they tried to make their appearances as distinct from one another as possible; for example, Fumero's character has straight hair while Beatriz's has wavy hair. Due to her lack of experience in comedy, Fumero was usually nervous, a trait the writers incorporated into Amy's personality. On September 17, 2013, Brooklyn Nine-Nine pilot aired, garnering over six million viewers and positive reviews. The A.V. Club praised the contrasts between Samberg's and Fumero's acting styles, calling her "a real find". Reviews of the first season were also positive, and it received 5.2 million total viewers.

In May 2014, Fox renewed Brooklyn Nine-Nine for a second season that would air during the 2014–2015 television season. Its premiere, "Undercover", was well received by critics. Reception of Fumero's performance was positive; Collider lauded her comedic timing, drive, and vulnerability, while Entertainment Weekly found her acting in a scene in which Amy tells Jake (Samberg) "[n]othing's going to happen" between them romantically convincing. Journalists lauded the rest of the season and deemed the cast "winning". In 2015, the show's cast were nominated for a Screen Actors Guild Award for Outstanding Performance by an Ensemble in a Comedy Series. Fumero's performance garnered her an Imagen Award nomination for Best Supporting Actress; she later received three more nominations for her work on the same show, including a win in 2022.

Brooklyn Nine-Nine third season premiered in September 2015. Fumero said she found comic acting much easier, having become more familiar with Amy's character, and added she had "fallen into a real groove and rhythm" with her approach to scenes. Fumero was pregnant during the season's production, which led to a storyline in which Amy goes undercover as a pregnant woman. The directors and camera operators used methods such as positioning her behind objects to hide her pregnancy. Of the experience, she said, "I don't recommend it", citing difficulties memorizing her lines and focusing on scenes. Brooklyn fourth and fifth seasons aired from September 2016 to May 2018; both seasons were acclaimed by critics, who continued to praise the ensemble.

In May 2018, Fox canceled Brooklyn after five seasons. The news quickly became the subject of social media campaigns for the show's renewal. A day after the cancellation, NBC accepted an offer to air the show for a sixth season. Fumero described the experience as "the most intense and emotional 36 hours of my life". On January 10, 2019, the season debuted to an audience of 3.6 million, the show's highest ratings in two years. Over its eighteen-episode run, it received 3.1 million viewers. Critics unanimously praised the season. The Hollywood Reporter commented the season premiere was "a quick and easy reminder of how good Fumero and Samberg are together"; the magazine said Samberg's smaller moments gave her the chance to be "wonderfully broad". Fumero's performance in the #MeToo-themed episode "He Said, She Said" garnered particular praise; Den of Geek found her phenomenal; TVLine named her their performer of the week, calling her performance "understated yet effective" and commending her "soft-spoken tone [that] captured the broken spirit of a woman burdened by victimhood, whose self-worth was forever sullied by the actions of a man who had power over her and chose to abuse it".

After Fumero complained about a director, her manager asked whether she was considering directing. Fumero dismissed the possibility but her manager had her direct a webisode, which she "ended up really loving". She was hesitant to ask NBC to let her direct an episode of Brooklyn Nine-Nine, although she felt more women of color should be directing: "I didn't ask this season, because it was NBC and ... we're women, and like, I don't wanna ruffle any feathers and it was like, I can't ask a boy to dance, they have to ask me." After the network ordered five additional episodes, and Joe Lo Truglio and Beatriz told her they were applying, Fumero did so as well. She made her directorial debut with the episode "Return of the King" in 2019. It received mixed reviews; The A.V. Club stated: "It's interesting to see Amy essentially direct Rosa to bizarre greatness as Melissa Fumero is actually directing this entire oddity of an episode". Fumero also appeared in Brooklyn seventh season.

In 2020, her vocal performance in Disney Junior's Elena of Avalor as Antonia—the titular character's seamster and later the first female member of the royal guard—Fumero earned her fourth Imagen Award nomination for Best Supporting Actress. The prior year, she appeared in the reboot of 1975 television series One Day at a Time. Fumero said the latter role was "especially huge" because she worked with Gloria Estefan, to whose songs she listened as a child.

2021–present: M.O.D.O.K and Blockbuster
In the animated series M.O.D.O.K., Fumero voiced Melissa Tarleton, the titular character's 17-year-old daughter who wants to gain his approval as a supervillain. When she auditioned, Fumero was not given any information about the show; she accepted the role when she learned Patton Oswalt would help develop and write the show, knowing it was "going to be hilarious". Of the show's premise, Fumero said: "I just thought that take was super fun and fresh to do a show from the point of view of a supervillain, to dive into what his family life could potentially be in this world of villains and supervillains." The show was released on May 21, 2021, to critical acclaim and particular praise for its cast. Commenting on Fumero's voice acting, Comic Book Resources said she "[brings Melissa] to life with just the right amount of teenaged moodiness".

Brooklyn Nine-Nine eighth and final season began its broadcast on August 12, 2021, with the episodes "The Good Ones" and "The Lake House". Both episodes garnered positive reviews, with The A.V. Club praising Fumero as one of the "comedic centerpieces" of the former. Reviews of the season were mostly positive. Fumero compared the experience of leaving Brooklyn to high-school graduation:

[Y]ou're so proud that you did the thing and you reached this moment, but you're also so sad because deep down, you know all your friends are going to different colleges and you're never going to see them again. It's that mix of really proud and grateful.

After finishing Brooklyn Nine-Nine, Fumero was unsure whether she wanted to act in another workplace comedy. However, she was excited when she was given the script for Netflix's comedy Blockbuster, whose writer Vanessa Ramos Fumero had met on Brooklyn Nine-Nine and described  as "one of the funniest people [she has] ever met". Fumero thought the script was "amazing" and accepted the role, partially because she wanted to work with Ramos and lead actor Randall Park. Fumero "immediately connected" to her character Eliza, a devoted mother who is experiencing difficulties with her marriage to her teenage boyfriend. Eliza, unlike Amy, felt lost. At first, Fumero felt nervous about portraying Eliza, who she wanted to ensure was a distinctive character. Blockbuster premiered on November 3, 2022. IGN described Fumero's performance as "engaging and sometimes passionate"; and Vanity Fair said the show's characters caused the actors to perform at "half speed".

In 2021, Fumero starred in the comedy film Bar Fight!. It follows former couple Nina (Fumero) and Allen (Luka Jones), who to avoid drama after their breakup divided everything in their lives—except their favorite local bar, an omission that causes a battle between them. The film was released on November 11, 2022, to negative reviews. Elizabeth Weitzman of TheWrap said Fumero and co-star Rachel Bloom "don't have the BFF chemistry both actresses work hard to generate, but that's because the characters are all sketched in two dimensions". That year, Fumero joined the cast of adult animated television series Digman!, reuniting with Samberg, the voice of the titular character and co-creator of the show.

Public image
Fumero appeared in The Hollywood Reporter "Young Hispanic Hollywood Class of 2013". In 2016, Variety listed her as one of its "10 Latinos to Watch". Women's Health included her in a list of "50 Latina and Hispanic Actresses Who Are Changing Hollywood for the Better" in 2021.

Personal life
Gallo met actor and former model David Fumero, a fellow Cuban-American who also appears on the show, on the set of One Life to Live. The two became engaged in late 2006 and married in New Jersey on December 9, 2007, with Gallo taking Fumero's name. The couple have two sons named Enzo (born March 24, 2016) and Axel (born February 14, 2020).

Filmography

Film

Television

Web

Audiobooks

Awards and nominations

Notes

References

External links

 

1982 births
21st-century American actresses
Actresses from New Jersey
American film actresses
American people of Cuban descent
American soap opera actresses
American television actresses
American voice actresses
Hispanic and Latino American actresses
Living people
Tisch School of the Arts alumni
People from Guttenberg, New Jersey
People from Lyndhurst, New Jersey
People from North Bergen, New Jersey